Stefan Krachunov (born 9 July 1985) is a Bulgarian footballer currently playing as a left back.

Football career
Krachunov has made one appearance in the Bulgarian A PFG for Botev Plovdiv and 63 appearances in the Bulgarian second division.

Futsal career
In 2017, he joined German club TV Wackersdorf to play futsal in the Futsal-Regionalliga. He made his debut in Wackersdorf's 8-4 away win over newly-promoted Villalobos Karlsruhe on 14 January 2017 (matchday 14).

References

External links 
 
 Stefan Krachunov player profile  at FuPa.net

1985 births
Living people
Bulgarian footballers
Botev Plovdiv players
FC Dunav Ruse players
PFC Nesebar players
PFC Vidima-Rakovski Sevlievo players
FC Vereya players
First Professional Football League (Bulgaria) players
Association football defenders